The following is a timeline of the history of the city of Kobe, Japan.

Prior to 20th century

 3rd century CE – Ikuta Shrine founded.
 1868
 Port of Kobe opens.
 Hiogo and Osaka Herald English-language newspaper begins publication.
 1870 – Kobe Regatta & Athletic Club established.
 1872 – Minatogawa Shrine established.
 1878 – Kobe Chamber of Commerce and Industry founded.
 1884 –  (newspaper) begins publication.
 1887 – Population: 103,969.
 1889 – Tōkaidō Main Line railway (Tokyo-Kobe) begins operating.
 1893 – Population: 153,382.
 1896 – Kinetoscope demonstrated at the Shinko Club.
 1898
 Kobe Shimbun (newspaper) begins publication.
 Population: 215,780.

20th century

 1902
  founded.
 Kawasaki Dockyard built.
 1903
 Kobe Golf Club formed.
 Population: 283,839.
 1905 – Kobe Seikosho in business.
 1907 – City emblem designed.
 1908 – Population: 378,197.
 1913 – Population: 442,167.
 1918 – Population: 592,726.
 1920 – Population: 664,471.
 1921 – Kobe Light Wave Society formed.
 1925 – Population: 644,212.
 1926 – Kobe Electric Railway established.
 1930 – Ashiya Camera Club formed.
 1931 – Nishi city ward established.
 1933
 Hyōgo city ward established.
 Port Festival begins.
 1935 – Population: 912,179
 1936
 Railway Sannomiya Station in operation.
 Kobe Bank established.
 1938 – Flooding.
 1939 – Kawasaki Heavy Industries in business.
 1940 – Population: 967,234.
 1942 – April 18: Aerial bombing by US forces.
 1945
 March 16–17: Bombing of Kobe in World War II.
 Population: 379,166.
 1946 – Tarumi city ward and Kobe Municipal College of Foreign Affairs established.
 1949 – Kobe University established.
 1950
 November: Korean-related  occurs.
 Population: 765,435.
 1951 – Kobe Oji Zoo founded.
 1955 – Population: 979,920.
 1956 – Kobe designated a government ordinance city.
 1957 – Sister city relationship established with Seattle, USA.
 1963 – Kobe Port Tower built.
 1967 – Kobe Carnival begins.
 1970 – Hyogo Prefectural Museum of Modern Art opens.
 1971 –  (festival) begins.
 1972 – Sanyō Shinkansen (hi-speed train) begins operating; Shin-Kobe Station opens.
 1975
 Nuclear-armed vessels prohibited from Kobe Port.
  built.
 Population: 1,360,000.
 1977 – Subway Seishin-Yamate Line begins operating.
1981 - The first fully Automated guideway transit driverless people mover train technology introduced on Port Island Line.
 1981 –  opens.
 1982 – Kobe City Museum opens.
 1988 – Subway Hokushin Line begins operating.
 1989 –  built.
 1991 –  built.
 1993 – Artificial Rokkō Island created.
 1995
 17 January: The 6.9  Great Hanshin earthquake shakes the southern Hyōgo Prefecture with a maximum Shindo of VII, leaving 5,502–6,434 people dead, and 251,301–310,000 displaced in the region.
 June: Post-earthquake city "Restoration Plan" published.
 December: Kobe Luminarie festival begins.
 Kobe Meriken Park Oriental Hotel in business.
 1996
 October: Earthquake-damaged Hanshin Expressway rebuilt.
 Animation Kobe event begins.
 1997 – Eco Asia meets in Kobe.
 1998 – Akashi Kaikyō Bridge built.
 2000 – Population: 1,493,595.

21st century

 2001 – Subway Kaigan Line begins operating; Harborland Station opens.
 2002 – Hyōgo Prefectural Museum of Art building opens.
 2006 – Kobe Airport opens.
 2007 –  opens.
 2010 – Population: 1,544,200.
 2013
 Kizō Hisamoto becomes mayor.
  opens.

See also
 Kobe history
 Timeline of Kobe (in Japanese)

References

This article incorporates information from the Japanese Wikipedia.

Bibliography

Published in the 20th century
 
 
 
 
 
 

Published in the 21st century
 
 
 
 
 
  (first published in 1987)

External links

 
 
 Items related to Kobe, various dates (via Europeana).
 Items related to Kobe, various dates (via Digital Public Library of America).

Kobe
History of Hyōgo Prefecture
Kobe
Years in Japan